Down the Line is a British radio comedy broadcast on BBC Radio 4, which satirises popular radio phone-in shows.  The show, hosted by "Gary Bellamy" (Rhys Thomas), is semi-improvised and is written and performed in a style of heightened realism.

Down the Line was first broadcast in May 2006. The pre-show publicity did not indicate that the show was a pre-recorded comedy, describing it as a live phone-in featuring "award winning" DJ Gary Bellamy, and led to many complaints from listeners who apparently failed to spot it was a spoof, generating considerable publicity for the programme. It was subsequently revealed that the show is written and performed by several familiar figures in British comedy, including Paul Whitehouse and Charlie Higson.

Regular 'callers' include:
 Christopher Nibbs from Pevensey Bay; a jokey character who refers to himself in the third person as 'Nibbsy' or 'The Nibbster'. Bellamy finds him amusing.
 Khalid, who only repeats topics of the show followed by the phrase 'what is point?' and responds to any subsequent remarks by Gary with the same question. Bellamy's attitude changes towards him as the series progresses.
 The Pearly King, a cheery cockney who talks about the 'pearly way'.
 Humphrey Milner, an elderly gentleman who uses endless examples to illustrate his point.
 Graham Downs, a morbidly obese man who has a sinus problem and is an archetypal loser. Often says he would "really like to get married".
 Chuck Perry, who laughs continuously and maniacally at his own feeble jokes and most other things.
 The military man, who responds to every topic stating that he is from a military background and that he would drive a van packed with explosives into the "issue" be it education or global warming.
 Early D begins his calls speaking with a very 'street' sounding "Jafaican" accent which gradually morphs into full-blown, barely decipherable Jamaican dialect. Bellamy never seems to notice. 
 Colin Williamson, who confesses to be a computer expert and general technology buff, viewing most conventional ways of doing things as "antiquated" but whose technical knowledge usually turns out to be useless. 
 George, who will phone in to comment on a subject to insist things were fine as they were and "Why must they keep mucking about with everything?'

Recording for the third series commenced on Monday 12 November 2007 and transmission began on 10 January 2008.

A television spinoff on BBC Two was announced on 2 April 2009. in which Gary Bellamy goes to the streets of the UK to meet 'real' people and get their opinions on a wide range of topics. The series is entitled Bellamy's People and was inspired by "all the television series of ‘famous people exploring Britain' that have been made over the last few years". The series features improvisation by the cast.

Series 1

Series 2 
A second series started on 16 January 2007 for another 6-week run until 20 February 2007.  "Guests" this series includes characters played by: Paul Whitehouse, Charlie Higson, Simon Day, Lucy Montgomery, Amelia Bullmore, Matt Lucas, Felix Dexter, Mark Gatiss, Catherine Tate, Arabella Weir, Robert Popper, Louis Vause, Simon Godley, Phoebe Higson, Sam Ward, Dave Cummings, and Fiona Whitehouse.

Series 3
Series 3 of Down The Line started its run on Thursday 10 January 2008, according to trailers broadcast in the preceding weeks. One trailer referred to the show as "DTL", spoofing BBC radio's tendency to call long-running programmes by their acronyms (as in 'FOOC' - From Our Own Correspondent, "WATO" - The World at One, etc.). "Guests" this series were played by Paul Whitehouse, Charlie Higson, Lucy Montgomery, Amelia Bullmore, Simon Day, Felix Dexter, Dave Cummings, Louis Vause, Matt Lucas, Lee Mack and Omid Djalili.

Series 4
Recording for a fourth series of Down The Line commenced in January 2011. "Guests" this series includes characters played by: Paul Whitehouse, Charlie Higson, Simon Day, Lucy Montgomery, Amelia Bullmore, Felix Dexter, Arabella Weir, Robert Popper, Adil Ray (who becomes a regular cast member from this series onwards), Rosie Cavaliero, Kevin Eldon, Julia Davis, Lee Mack, Louis Vause, Dave Cummings, and Fiona Whitehouse. The seven episode series commenced broadcast on Tuesday 15 March 2011 at 6.30pm.

Series 5
Series 5 began broadcast on 1 May 2013, and consists of 4 episodes

One-off editions

References

External links

BBC Radio 4 programmes
BBC Radio comedy programmes